Cyanonephron is a genus of cyanobacteria in the family Synechococcaceae.

References 

 Hällfors, G. (2004). Checklist of Baltic Sea Phytoplankton Species (including some heterotrophic protistan groups). Baltic Sea Environment Proceedings. No. 95: 210

External links 
 
 Cyanonephron at algaebase

Synechococcales
Cyanobacteria genera